Agnes River may refer to:

Australia
Agnes River (Australia)

Canada
Agnes River (Spanish River), in Sudbury District, Ontario